"Woke Up Late" is a song by New Zealand band Drax Project, originally released in November 2017. It reached number 15 on the New Zealand Singles Chart and was included on their 2018 EP Noon.

Background
In September 2019, Drax Project re-recorded the song for Waiata / Anthems, a collection of re-recorded New Zealand pop songs to promote te Wiki o te Reo Māori (Māori Language Week). The new version, retitled "I Moeroa / Woke Up Late", featured lyrics reinterpreted by scholar Tīmoti Kāretu. This version reached number six on the New Zealand artists' singles chart.

Track listing

Charts

Weekly charts

Year-end charts

Certifications

Release history

Drax Project and Hailee Steinfeld version

The duet version featuring American actress and singer Hailee Steinfeld was released on 21 January 2019 as the lead single from her self-titled debut studio album (2019).

Background
The band said that it "cross[ed] our minds while writing it as to how it might work as a duet -- with a female voice telling her side", and so they reached out to Steinfeld as they liked her songs "Starving" and "Let Me Go". The collaboration happened after Drax Project toured with singer Camila Cabello. A member of Cabello's team was good friends with Steinfeld, and after showing her the song, she loved it and asked the band to be a featured vocalist on the track. iHeartRadio noted how the song "tells the story of sleeping in after a wild night out, realizing you're at someone else's house".

In March 2019, the version featuring Hailee Steinfeld was featured in an episode of CBS's MacGyver. In May 2019, a remix of the song by Sam Feldt was released.

Chart performance
The duet version peaked at number 29 on the Mainstream Top 40, 18 in the Australia and 35 in New Zealand.

Music video
The official music video was released to the band's YouTube channel on 9 April 2019. It was directed by Jonathon Singer-Vine and filmed in Los Angeles. It features American YouTuber Liza Koshy.

Critical reception
Billboard called the song a "fizzy pop track" and complimented both the band and Steinfield's "sweet falsettos". Idolator labelled the song a "hit" and an "anthem", and said Steinfeld's feature "adds another perspective to the ode to a developing relationship". The Official Charts Company named Drax Project "one to watch" and said the track "gives a pretty good impression of their overall sound", which it described as a "healthy mix of pop, dance and hip-hop".

Track listing

Charts

Weekly charts

Year-end charts

Certifications

Release history

References

2017 songs
2017 singles
2019 singles
Drax Project songs
Hailee Steinfeld songs